Boldklubben Fremad Amager (meaning in English: The Ball Club Forward Amager ; abbreviated Fremad A) is a Danish professional football club based in the district of Amager Vest, Copenhagen. As of the 2020–21 season, the club's senior men's team play in 1st Division, the second-tier of professional football in the country. The club consists of an amateur department and a professional section, that is wholly owned by Fremad Amager Elite ApS – a private limited company created on 2 December 2013, initially with 80/20% ownership split between the new investors and the remaining 20% by the members – and small portion by the club's amateur department. The club have primarily played their home games at Sundby Idrætspark since the stadium's inauguration in 1922. Fremad Amager's last spell in the highest football league in Denmark was in the autumn of 1994. Ever since the first participation in the first nationwide league tournament in 1927, and subsequent promotion in 1929, the club has spent the majority of its history – with the exception of two seasons – in the different divisional structures (known as "Danmarksturneringen i fodbold"). The club reached the Danish Cup final in 1971–72 season while playing at the second highest league level, but lost against Vejle BK, who had also won the Danish championship in 1971. As a result, BK Fremad Amager participated in the 1972–73 European Cup Winners' Cup, but did not advance beyond the first round.

The club was co-founder of the representative team Fodbold-Alliancen in 1940 and remained a member until 1949, when they switched to the competing representative team Stævnet and stayed with the football combination for a total of 25 years (1949–1954 and 1959–1979) until it ceased to exist in 1979. On 1 July 2008, the club participated in the formation of the superstructure FC Amager together with neighbouring clubs Dragør BK, Kastrup BK and Kløvermarken FB. The merger was short-lived. After only 8-month of existence, the merger club went bankrupt on 30 March 2009 at the start of second half of the 2008–09 season, with Fremad Amager hence experiencing a third bankruptcy in its history – the highest number of bankruptcies by any Danish football club; the first being on 22 November 1984 and the second on 13 November 1990. The league licence, that the merger team was playing under, was returned to Fremad Amager, who was relegated to the lower ranking regional football league, Copenhagen Series, shortly before the club's 100 years anniversary. Being described as a working class team, the Sundbyvester-based club enjoy long-standing rivalries against neighbouring clubs BK Frem, Kastrup BK and B 1908.

Colours and crest
BK Fremad Amager's official colour scheme is blue and white. The shirt design have had several variations to its design throughout the club's history. The club's first playing kit after its foundation was inspired by the blue and white striped shirt and black shorts worn by the players of one of the period's best Danish association football teams, Kjøbenhavns BK (KB). In the early years of the club, the shirt design was not standardised, and several variations (e.g. collars vs. round-necks, striped vs. single colour sleeves and the same number of stripes not aligned in the same formation) appeared during matches. A few years before the club's promotion to the KBUs Mesterskabsrække in the 1920s, an entire black home kit dominated by a red thick "V"-shaped pattern in the front and back, starting from the shoulders going all the way down to the players stomach/lower back, was adopted. In 1945, a slow transition to a new shirt design was initiated, when the club's youth and senior teams started playing in a blue shirt with white collar and white sleeves, white shorts and blue socks, but did not completely leave the previous black/red shirt design behind until the following year. For many years this kit design was mentioned directly in the second paragraph in the club's statutes (e.g. ratified on 2 February 2005), but the sentences have since February 2008 been simplified to only include a reference to a blue shirt, while the away kit can have different colours. The current home kit's basic design consists of a blue shirt, white shorts and blue socks, which was first used in 1973.

Combinations of or deviations from the home and away kit design have occurred, including temporarily using a third unofficial kit design or colour, to accommodate an unexpected situation before or during a match. During a 1927–28 KBUs Mesterskabsrække match against BK Frem at Københavns Idrætspark on 6 May 1928, the players was forced to change their outfit from red shirts and white shorts in the first half to red shirts and black shorts in the second half, because the combination were too similar to BK Frem's kit (red/blue vertical striped shirts and white shorts). For the 1926–27 KBUs Mesterskabsrække campaign, the club used a secondary kit design consisting of a red and white halved jersey, black shorts and red socks, which was prominently featured in their first league fixture of the season against BK Frem and in the relegation play-off match at the end of the season against Handelsstandens BK. A similar secondary kit design had been in use for the 1925 Fælledklubbernes Pokalturnering campaign, but with a blue and white colour scheme, resembling the traditional shirt design of Blackburn Rovers F.C.

The current club crest was introduced in the summer of 1952, featuring a shield with the club's name in capital, oblique letters across the midsection in a left to right diagonal line, with a 1950-era 18-panel ball (model without laces) in the top left corner and the letter A (short for Amager) in the bottom right corner. It replaced the club's first crest, a circular emblem featuring a black and white vintage eight panel stitched ball with five laces on the left side (known from beginning of the 20th century, appearance identical to a basketball), with the name of the club in capital letters across the top section (the letters "R" and "A" interlocking each other and the letters "F" and "D" extended in a simplified calligraphy style). The club's second crest first featured on the player's left chest on the shirt at the start of the 1950s, but disappeared shortly hereafter, and did not reappear as a regular component until the 2000s. The names of the original designers of both crests are unknown. Professionalism in Danish association football was introduced during the 1970s, making way for prize checks to the players and shirt sponsors. The first sponsor displayed on the front of the player's shirts was the local company Storno, who signed a two-years contract for the period 1970–71. For the club's centenary celebrations in 2010, a special emblem was inscribed in a green-coloured wreath consisting of crossed conventionalized branches of the olive tree (similar to the flag of the United Nations) and text above and below the shield noting the centenary.

Uniform evolution

Home kit

Away kit

Kit manufacturers and shirt sponsors

Grounds
Boldklubben Fremad started placing at a field located across the road of the then "Cyklistpavillonen Alhambra Park" (demolished in 1916), where the club was originally founded. The field was later converted to a traffic hotspot/square now known as Sundbyvester Plads. In 1916 Amager Boldspil-Union (ABU) was assigned an area by the local municipality in the northern part of Amager, now known as Kløvermarken. The club started playing all their important matches in the local league and cup tournaments at a ground referred to as "Banen ved Kløvermarksvejen", which was located across a pumping station, handling most of the capital's waste water – hence, the isle is nicknamed "Lorteøen". The old ground was kept as a playing field for the reserve teams and the youth squads for a couple of years. In 1922, the club officially moved into Sundby Idrætspark (also referred to as "Banen ved Englandsvej"), which has been their home ground ever since. The club started playing several league and cup matches in 1926 at Københavns Idrætspark, when they were promoting the KBUs Mesterskabsrække. Due to the then-lack of facilities (spot lights etc.) and capacity at Sundby Idrætspark, some competitive matches in later years were moved to Valby Idrætspark and Gentofte Sportspark. In the summer of 2018, the playing field was converted to artificial grass and spot lights were installed.

First-team squad

Youth players in use 2022-23

Out on loan

Notable former players

Retired numbers
Retiring of shirt numbers is not a custom followed by the club's board. Only once have a number been officially retired in honor of the official fan club, the first incarnation of De Blå/Hvide Engle (1993–2008), as a reference to the fans being the twelfth man on the team. The proposal, originally conceived by the fan club in the fall of 2007, was however short-lived and 12 was quickly reinstated as a valid shirt number in the wake of the introduction of an official fan club, named Øens Ørne (2008–2009), for the superstructure FC Amager. The original fan club was refounded in the fall of 2009.

12    De Blå/Hvide Engle (official fan club)

Personnel

Current technical staff

Head coach history
Before the club's permanent introduction of a sovereign head coach/trainer, the line-up for each game and training for both the first team and the reserves was headed by members of a match selection committee – referred to as udtagelseskomite (UK) or spilleudvalg – that also consisted of representatives from the board and players, all headed by a chairman, and elected at the club's annual general meeting. At times, the committee consisted of a single person, which was the case during the period 1966–1970 (headed by Leif Foli Andersen) – at a general meeting in late January 1971, this was changed to a committee of three members. This was following by a period, where the head coach was dependent of the dispositions of the committee and their voting rights, until the committee in itself was ultimately abolished in the 1980s. The person responsible for direction of the first senior team has since traditionally been given the title of head coach/trainer, and the position was first held by Sophus Hansen in 1928. The Amager-based club introduced the manager title for the first time on 1 January 2002, when Michele Guarini assumed the role as both manager and head coach/trainer. Between 27 October 2006 and 29 March 2007, Benny Johansen was given the title of manager/sports director with the primary responsibility for e.g. tactical match team composition, playing strategy and training planning, while Peer F. Hansen was given the title of first senior team coach/trainer and second in line under the manager. The tasks related to the manager/sports director position have varied, but more responsibilities have generally been given to the head coach.

Former player Ole Bloch and the then UK-chairman Poul Mathiasen acted as temporary coaches during two league matches on 7 and 14 November 1976, when the newly appointed head coach, Flemming Olsen, became absent due to a pre-scheduled course stay in Switzerland –  they are hence not ranked in the official list of head coaches. Flemming Olsen was first supposed to take over the team's training from 1 January 1977, but his tenure was pushed ahead of time, when Arne Sørensen was hospitalised the day before a league match on 31 October 1976. Due to head coach Benny Johansen's double bypass surgery at a London hospital in January 2005, the assistant coach Peer F. Hansen and the coach for the reserves, Jan Zirk, took care of the training and headed the friendlies for several weeks during the winter break, until the head coach officially returned ahead of the spring season's first match on 6 March 2005.

Following the declaration of bankruptcy of the professional superstructure, FC Amager, on 30 March 2009, the reserve team of BK Fremad Amager did formally not obtain an official status as the amateur club's new first senior men's team until the end of the 2008–09 season, when the league license was returned to the club. Effective immediately, all players and the coaching staff were released from their contractual obligations with FC Amager, including Michael Madsen. Hence, Lars Randrup, who was the head coach for the club's reserve team in the Copenhagen Series between 30 March and 30 June 2009, is not regarded as the club's official head coach during the intervening period. The Amager-club's first and only coaching-duo, Kim Petersen and Alex Andreasen, shared the role and responsibilities of head and assistant coach evenly in the fall season of 2009. After eight months as head coach for the team, Azrudin "Vali" Valentić became first team coach in the club on 1 July 2019, when Olof Mellberg becoming manager in a new structure of the coaching staff, resembling a British-style constellation.

 : Persons with this symbol in the "Name" column are italicised to denote caretaker appointments.
 : Persons with this symbol in the "Name" column denote status as a playing head coach/trainer.
 S: Fremad Amager participated in the professional superstructure, FC Amager (July 2008 – March 2009), effectively making it the club's official representative/first senior men's team.

Honours and accolades

Domestic

National leagues
 Danish Football Championship1
 Runners-up (2): 1939–40, 1940–41
 Third place (1): 1946–47
 Second Highest Danish League2
 Winners (2): 1930–31, 1937–38
 Runners-up (5): 1948–49, 1949–50, 1950–51, 1993q, 1994f
 Group East Runners-up (1): 1935–36
 Third Highest Danish League3
 Runners-up (4): 1954–55, 1958, 1969, 1971, 2015–16
 Group East Winners (4): 1969, 1971, 1987, 1991–92q
 Group East Runners-up (4): 1968, 1991, 2007–08
 Fourth Highest Danish League4
 Winners (1): 1964
 Group 1 Winners (2): 1974, 1976
 Group 1 Runners-up (1): 2010–11

Regional leagues
 Københavnsserien5
 Winners (3): 1983, 1994, 2009–10
 Reserve League Winners (3): 1949–50, 1950–51, 1973
 Reserve League Runners-up (2): 1948–49, 1967
 KBUs A-række6
 Winners (2): 1924–25, 1925–26
 Runners-up (2): 1929–30, 1935–36
 KBUs Deltagerturnering7
 Winners (1): 1920–21
 ABUs Amager-Mesterskabsturnering
 Runners-up (2): 1912, 1915–16

Cups
 DBU Pokalen
 Runners-up (1): 1971–72
 KBUs Pokalturnering
 Winners (1): 1952
 Runners-up (1): 1933
 KBUs Sommerpokalturnering
 Runners-up (1): 1936
 Fælledklubbernes Pokalturnering
 Winners (1): 1924
 Forstadsklubbernes Pokalturnering
 Winners (3): 1926, 1927, 1929
 Runners-up (1): 1928
 ABUs/Amagerklubbernes Pokalturnering
 Winners (2): 1922, 1930
 Runners-up (3): 1927, 1928, 1932

 : Honour achieved by the reserve team.
 1: Level 1: Danmarksmesterskabsturneringen (1927–1929), Mesterskabsserien (1929–1940), Danmarksturneringen (1940–1945), 1. division (1945–1990), Superligaen (1991–present)
 2: Level 2: Oprykningsserien (1929–1936), II. Serie (1936–1940), 2. division (1945–1990), Kvalifikationsligaen (1992s, 1993s, 1994s, 1995s), 1. division (1991–present)
 3: Level 3: III. Serie (1936–1940), 3. division (1945–1990), 2. division (1991–present)
 4: Level 4: Kvalifikationsturneringen (1946–1965), Kvalifikationsrækken (1996–2000), Danmarksserien for herrer (1966–present)
 5: Level 5 (Level 1 under DBU Copenhagen): KBUs Mesterskabsrække (1920–1936), KBUs A-række (1936–1947), Københavnsserien A / Københavnsserien B (1947–1977), Københavnsserien (1978–present)
 6: Level 6 (Level 2 under DBU Copenhagen): KBUs A-række (1920–1936), KBUs B-række (1936–1947), KBUs Mellemrække (1947–1984), KBUs Serie 1 (1985–2011), DBU København Serie 1 (2011–present)
 7: Level 7 (Level 3 under DBU Copenhagen): KBUs Deltagerturnering  & KBUs Forstadsturnering (1920–21), KBUs B-række (1921–1936), KBUs C-række (1944–1947), KBUs A-række (1947–1984), KBUs Serie 2 (1985–2011), DBU København Serie 2 (2011–present)

European
 UEFA Cup Winners' Cup:
 First round (1): 1972–73

Achievements

In 1912, two years after the club's formation, the club joined Amager Boldspil-Union (ABU) and later also participated in tournaments organized by Københavns Forstadsklubbers Boldspil Union (KFBU). The club became an extraordinary member of the Copenhagen Football Association (KBU) in 1920 and a full member in 1921, enabling the club to participate in the leagues organized by the regional organization, between 1920 and 1927, but did not qualify for the national championship play-offs, Landsfodboldturneringen. Since 1927, Fremad Amager have primarily played in the top three tiers of the Danish football league system with the exception of four seasons during two periods (1963–1964 and 2009/10–2010/11). Due to the league structures, between the 1927–28 and 1935–36 seasons, the club was made to play in both a national and regional league, which is reflected in the overview below.

19.5 seasons in the Highest Danish League
41.5 seasons in the Second Highest Danish League
26 seasons in the Third Highest Danish League
3 seasons in the Fourth Highest Danish League
9 seasonR in the Fifth Highest Danish League
7 seasonsR in the Sixth Highest Danish League
1 seasonR in the Seventh Highest Danish League
 Overview has been updated to include the 2019–20 season. A season is one year long.
 R: The overview details all seasons played under both the Danish FA and the Copenhagen FA since 1920, and distinguishes between participation in regional and national leagues, converted into the current situation in the Danish football league system.

References

External links
 Official website for the professional section 
 Official website for the amateur section 

 
Football clubs in Denmark
Football clubs in Copenhagen
1910 establishments in Denmark
Amager